James W. Stigler is an American psychologist, researcher, entrepreneur and author. He is Distinguished Professor in the Department of Psychology at University of California, Los Angeles and a Fellow of the Precision Institute at National University, San Diego.

Stigler's research is focused on understanding processes of teaching and learning, especially of mathematics and science. He has also conducted research on reshaping the role of research and development in education. He is the co-author of two books, The Teaching Gap and The Learning Gap.

Stigler has received several awards for his research, including a Guggenheim Fellowship and the QuEST award from the American Federation of Teachers. He is a fellow with the American Psychological Society and the American Educational Research Association, and a member of the National Academy of Education.

Education 
Stigler received an A.B. in Religious Studies from Brown University in 1976 and an M.S. in Education from University of Pennsylvania in 1977. Later, he received an M.A. in Developmental Psychology in 1979 and a Ph.D. in Developmental Psychology in 1982, both from University of Michigan.

Career 
Stigler joined the University of Chicago in 1983 as an Assistant Professor, becoming Associate Professor in 1989. In 1991, he left the University of Chicago and taught briefly at Dartmouth College before joining University of California, Los Angeles where he has remained since. He was appointed as Associate Dean for Research and Innovation in the UCLA Division of Social Sciences in 2011 and served in this position until 2016. From 2008 to 2017, he was a Senior Fellow at the Carnegie Foundation for the Advancement of Teaching.

In 2017, the Precision Institute at National University, San Diego appointed him as a Fellow. At the Precision Institute, he has worked to develop and share research aligned with the Institute's mission of expanding data-driven approaches to identifying and applying effective personalized learning methodologies in higher education.

From 1997 to 2001, Stigler served on the Board of Behavioral, Cognitive and Sensory Sciences at National Academy of Sciences.

Entrepreneurship 
Throughout his career, Stigler has been involved in founding companies that tie into his research. In 1995, Stigler founded Digital Lava, a multimedia technology company and took the company to IPO in 1999. He founded LessonLab, Inc. in 1998 and served as its CEO until 2003, when it was acquired by Pearson. Thereafter, he was appointed as the Senior Vice President of Research at Pearson Achievement Solutions and worked in this position until 2007.

In 2013, he co-founded (with his son Charlie Stigler) Zaption, an education technology company in the video learning space. Zaption was acquired by Workday in 2016.

Research

Understanding and improving teaching and learning 
In the beginning of his career, Stigler's research was focused primarily on cross-cultural comparison of teaching and learning, producing a number of studies and articles, and two trade books: The Learning Gap (co-authored with Harold W. Stevenson) and The Teaching Gap (co-authored with James Hiebert). The latter book reported on the first of two large video surveys he directed in the 1990s, the TIMSS Video Studies, and compared eighth-grade mathematics teaching in Germany, Japan, and the United States. Most of his work has focused on mathematics teaching and learning.

Through this work Stigler became well known for his work in the analysis of classroom video, both cross-culturally and within cultures as a means of explaining within-culture variation in teachers’ Value Added Assessment (VAE) scores. He collaborated with a group of Scandinavian researchers on a study comparing algebra teaching in Finland, Norway, Sweden, and the US.

In later research, Stigler extended this work in various ways. In research with Nicole Kersting at the University of Arizona, Stigler focused on teacher knowledge and how it impacts instructional quality and student learning. A key innovation in this work was the development of the Classroom Video Analysis (CVA) assessment of teacher knowledge.

In the late 2000s Stigler started researching what community college students remember and understand about basic middle- and high-school mathematics, producing several papers (with Karen Givvin) that documented the fragile and fragmented nature of what remains of students’ K12 mathematics education.

In the late 2010s Stigler started a collaboration with Ji Son at California State University, Los Angeles. They worked on a theory-based course redesign of introductory statistics as a means of developing and testing what they called the practicing connections hypothesis.
 
According to this hypothesis, extensive and deliberate practice applying core concepts and representations of a domain to increasingly complex problems throughout a course will result in knowledge that is more coherent, flexible and transferable. They published the first version of an interactive online textbook based on the approach in 2017, and the first paper to come from this collaboration in 2018.

Education R&D and improvement science 
Some of Stigler's research has been focused on re-thinking how R&D for education is carried out. Part of this effort has been conducted in collaboration with the Carnegie Foundation for the Advancement of Teaching, where he served as a Senior Fellow from 2008 to 2017 and contributed to the development of Carnegie's Statway program for community colleges.

In August 2017, Stigler and his team at UCLA, with funding from the Chan Zuckerberg Initiative, has been developing what he calls the Better Book approach to education research and development, as well as a technology platform (CourseKata) designed to support the approach. Instead of researchers, curriculum developers, and instructors working in silos, the Better Book approach involves an ongoing collaboration focused on incremental and continuous improvements to an online interactive textbook based on student-generated data. The first focus of the Better Book approach is the introductory statistics book co-authored with Ji Son.

Awards and honors 
1985 - William G. Chase Memorial Award for Outstanding Research by a Young Scientist in the General Area of Cognitive Psychology, Carnegie Mellon University
1986 - Spencer Fellowship, awarded by the National Academy of Education
1989 - Boyd R. McCandless Young Scientist Award, Division 7 of the American Psychological Association
1989 - 1990 - Fellow, Center for Advanced Study in the Behavioral Sciences, Stanford, California
1989 - 1990 - Guggenheim Fellowship, John Simon Guggenheim Memorial Foundation
1989 - 1990 - Review of Research Award, American Educational Research Association
1995 - American Federation of Teachers QUEST Award
1997 - University of Pennsylvania Alumni Association National Award of Distinction
2000 - American Educational Studies Association Critics’ Choice Award (for The Teaching Gap)
2003 - Member, National Academy of Education
2008 - Fellow, American Educational Research Association
2013 - Fellow, Association for Psychological Science

Selected publications

Books 
The Learning Gap: Why Our Schools Are Failing and What We Learn from Japanese and English Education. (1992)
The Teaching Gap: Best Ideas From the World’s Teachers for Improving Education in the Classroom. (1999/2009). (Japanese translation published 2002)
Introduction to Statistics: A Modeling Approach. (2017)

Selected articles 
Stigler, J. W. (1984).  "Mental Abacus": The effect of abacus training on Chinese children's mental calculation. Cognitive Psychology, 16, 145–176.
Stevenson, H. W., Lee, S. Y., and Stigler, J. W. (1986).  Mathematics achievement of Chinese, Japanese and American children.  Science, 231, 693–699.
Stigler, J. W., Fernandez, C., and Yoshida, M.  (1996).  Cultures of mathematics instruction in Japanese and American elementary classrooms.  In T. Rohlen and G. Le Tendre (Eds.), Teaching and learning in Japan.  New York: Cambridge University Press.  pp. 213–247. 
Stigler, J.W., Gallimore, R., and Hiebert, J. (2000). Using video surveys to compare classrooms and teaching across cultures: Examples and lessons from the TIMSS and TIMSS-R video studies. Educational Psychologist, Volume 35, Number 2, Spring. Pages 87–100. 
Hiebert, J., Gallimore, R., and Stigler, J.W. (2002). A knowledge base for the teaching profession: What would it look like, and how can we get one? Educational Researcher, 31, 5, 3-15. 
Stigler, J.W. & Thompson, B. (2009). Thoughts on creating, accumulating, and utilizing shareable knowledge to improve teaching. Elementary School Journal, Volume 109, No. 5, 442–457.
Stigler, J.W., Givvin, K.B. & Thompson, B. (2010). What community college developmental mathematics students understand about mathematics. The MathAMATYC Educator, Volume 1, No. 3, 4-16.
Givvin, K.B., Stigler, J.W. & Thompson, B. (2011). What community college developmental mathematics students understand about mathematics, part 2: The interviews. The MathAMATYC Educator, Volume 2, No. 3, 4-18.
Richland, L. E., Stigler, J. W., & Holyoak, K. J. (2012). Teaching the conceptual structure of mathematics. Educational Psychologist, 47(3), 189–203. 
Kersting, N. B., Givvin, K. B., Thompson, B. J., Santagata, R., & Stigler, J. W. (2012). Measuring usable knowledge: Teachers’ analyses of mathematics classroom videos predict teaching quality and student learning. American Educational Research Journal, 49(3), 568–589. 
Stigler, J. W., & Hiebert, J. (2017). The culture of teaching: A global perspective. In A. Motoko & G. K. LeTendre (Eds.), International handbook of teacher quality and policy. New York: Routledge, pages 52–65.
Stigler, J. W. & Miller, K. F. (2018). Expertise and expert performance in teaching. In K. A. Ericsson, R. Hoffman, A. Kozbelt & A. M. Williams (Eds.) The Cambridge Handbook of Expertise and Expert Performance. Cambridge: Cambridge University Press, pages 431–452. 
Son, J. Y., Ramos, P., DeWolf, M., Loftus, W. & Stigler, J. W. (2018). Exploring the practicing-connections hypothesis: using gesture to support coordination of ideas in understanding a complex statistical concept. Cognitive Research: Principles and Implications [2365-7464], 3:1 (1-13).

References 

Living people
Brown University alumni
University of Pennsylvania alumni
University of Michigan alumni
University of California, Los Angeles faculty
University of Chicago faculty
Year of birth missing (living people)